Charice is the debut international studio album and third overall release by Filipino pop singer Jake Zyrus under his pre-transition name Charice. It was released on May 11, 2010, under Reprise Records, making him the third Filipino singer to be signed on an international record label, the first being Lea Salonga (on Atlantic Records in 1993) and Regine Velasquez (on Mercury Records in 1994). It was released prior to Zyrus' gender transition thus the eponymous album is credited under his former name, Charice.

It was launched on The Oprah Winfrey Show during the World's Most Talented Kids episode with Iyaz on the same day. The album, immediately upon release in the United States, debuted at number eight on the Billboard 200, making Zyrus the first Asian artist to reach the top 10 on the chart solo.

The lead single, "Pyramid", featuring Iyaz, was released as the second and last single from the album on March 2, 2010. The single reached number 17 on the UK Singles Chart, making Zyrus the first Filipino singer to have a top 20 single in the UK. In Japan, the album was the 81st best selling album of 2010 according to Oricon, selling over 98,000 copies.

Promotion
Upon the release of the album, Zyrus appeared on The Oprah Winfrey Show, where he performed, "Pyramid" and "In This Song". He also performed it on QVC with his other songs from his self-titled album, Zyrus, such as "I Love You", "Note to God" and "In This Song". He also sang "In This Song" on Live with Regis and Kelly.

Singles
 "Note to God" was released as the album's first North American single on May 15, 2009.
 "Pyramid", featuring Iyaz was released as the album's lead international and second US single on March 2, 2010.
 "Crescent Moon" was released as third single in Japan.

Critical reception

Mikael Wood from the Los Angeles Times gave the album a mixed review, saying that it "darts somewhat haphazardly from sleek dance-pop tunes ... to schmaltzy slow jams" but also that "it also feels like an honest showcase of the singer's voice ... its strength lives up to that of her collaborators."

AllMusic's Andy Kellman gave it 3 out of 5 stars and wrote "As a showcase for a teenage powerhouse vocalist, Charice (Zyrus' former name) does succeed, but a more balanced mix of heart-heavy and upbeat material would have made the desired Whitney Houston and Mariah Carey comparisons more accurate".

Billboard gave the album a generally positive review, noting that "the set's stylistic shifts--from teen-oriented pop to a touch of rock ("In Love So Deep") to anthemic ballads—ultimately leaves you wondering just which audience Charice is eyeing: her teen peers or their moms," before concluding that "Though it doesn't hit on all cylinders, the album leaves no doubt as to Charice's talent--and promising future."

Commercial performance
The album debuted at number eight on the Billboard 200 chart (issue of May 29, 2010), with sales of 43,000 copies in its first week of release in the United States. In Canada the album debuted at number four on the Billboard Canadian Albums.

Track listing

North American edition

Japan edition

UK edition

Additional notes
"Reset" (which is track #2) contains Filipino lines in the bridge part of the song.

Charts

Release history

References

2010 debut albums
Jake Zyrus albums
Albums produced by Billy Steinberg
Albums produced by Brian Kennedy (record producer)
Albums produced by David Foster
Albums produced by Emanuel Kiriakou
Albums produced by Twin
Reprise Records albums